Rama (Punjabi: ਰਾਮ ), known as Ram Avatar (ਰਾਮ ਅਵਤਾਰ) or Raja Ram (ਰਾਜਾ ਰਾਮ), is considered an important figure in Sikhism, due to his inclusion as one among the 24 incarnations of Vishnu in the Chaubis Avtar, a composition in the Dasam Granth traditionally and historically attributed to Guru Gobind Singh. The discussion of Rama and Krishna is the most extensive in this section of the secondary Sikh scripture. The composition is martial, stating that the avatar of Vishnu appears in the world to restore good and defeat evil, but asserts that these avatars are not God,but agents of the God. God is beyond birth and death. 

There have been claims that the Ram in Sikhism is not related to the Rama described in the Ramayana. In Guru Granth Sahib, there are differences between Ram Chander (ਰਾਮ ਚੰਦਰ), the king of Ayodhya, and Ram, the all-prevailing God.

Sources

Guru Granth Sahib
Guru Nanak rejected the concept of divine incarnation as present in Hinduism but used words such as Ram, Mohan, Hari & Shiv as ways of referring to the divine together with Islamic words like Allah & Khuda. Bhagat Kabir makes it clear that there is a difference between Ram Chander (King of Ayodhya) and Ram (the all prevailing God).

Dasam Granth
Rama is mentioned as one among the 24 incarnations of Vishnu in the Chaubis Avtar, a composition in Dasam Granth traditionally and historically attributed to Guru Gobind Singh. Although the compositions of the Dasam Granth are traditionally accepted to be written by Guru Gobind Singh, there have been questions of the authenticity of the entirety of Dasam Granth from time of compilation.

Importance 

Rama is considered an important figure in Sikhism and depicted as a source of inner peace, inspiration and bravery.

Ram Mandir 
The judgement also states that Rajinder Singh attached various janam sakhis to support his statements. Others have discredited the statements of Rajinder Singh on the basis of the janam sakhis attached dating from 18th century and later, which is stated to be a time period when Brahminical revivalism became evident in such works. The SGPC passed a resolution condemning this verdict. Sikh scholars have the view that Guru Nanak went to religious sites like Mecca and Ayodhya to preach and spread his message rather than for pilgrimage.

See also 

 Hinduism and Sikhism
 Rama in Jainism

Notes

Sources

Citations

References

External links 

 Rama: Sikh encyclopedia
 Raja Rama in Sikhism

Rama
Hinduism and other religions
Dasam Granth